Branded Outlaw is a Western adventure that takes place in the wild west of New Mexico, written by L. Ron Hubbard. It was first published in the October 1938 issue of Five Novels Monthly magazine.

Plot Introduction
The story is about the adventures of cowboy Lee Weston who hears from his father that an old enemy, Harvey Dodge, is back in town. Lee rides out in a hurry from Wyoming to Pecos, New Mexico only to find his father murdered and the family ranch burned to the ground. Lee is certain that Harvey Dodge is to blame, and he sets off to settle the score. Along the way he gets into a fiery gun battle in the town of Pecos. Lee is badly wounded and flees into the mountains just before passing out. As fate would have it, Dodge's beautiful, yet independently minded, daughter Ellen, finds Lee and secretly nurses him back to health. But when Lee insists on continuing his plan to get revenge on his enemy, he gets himself into even more trouble, a near lynching at the hands of an angry mob, and the scorn of the girl he had fallen for.

Publication History
Branded Outlaw was written and published in 1938, and contains the pulp fiction style shoot'em up action, bad guys, classic Western heroes, true love, and in the end law and order and justice triumph.

Branded Outlaw is from the Golden Age series which Galaxy Press started re-publishing in 2008. The book has been re-released in paperback, with French flaps, glossaries, and author bio. It is also available as a full-cast audiobook featuring David O'Donnell, R.F. Daley, Bob Caso, Jim Meskimen and Tamra Meskimen.

References

1938 American novels
Western (genre) novels
Novels by L. Ron Hubbard